Cefpimizole (INN) is a third-generation cephalosporin antibiotic.

References 
 

Cephalosporin antibiotics
Enantiopure drugs
Imidazoles
Pyridines